Douglas Lee LaMalfa (born July 2, 1960) is an American politician serving as the U.S. representative for California's 1st congressional district since 2013. A member of the Republican Party, his district, formerly the second-largest in the state after the 8th, covers nearly all of interior Northern California, including Chico, Redding, and Susanville.

A native of Oroville, LaMalfa was the California State Assemblyman for the 2nd district from 2002 to 2008 and California State Senator from the 4th district from 2010 to 2012.

Early life, education and career
LaMalfa is a fourth-generation rice farmer and lifelong Northern California resident. He graduated from Cal Poly San Luis Obispo with a Bachelor's degree in agricultural business.

In 2022, 63% of LaMalfa's campaign contributions came from inside his state, but only 25% of contributions came from inside his district.

California Assembly

Elections
In 2002, LaMalfa ran for the California Assembly in the 2nd District. He won the Republican primary with 59% of the vote, and the general election with 67%. He was reelected in 2004 (68%) and 2006 (68%).

Tenure

LaMalfa worked with Bernie Richter as an early supporter of Proposition 209, which ended affirmative action in California. He worked for passage of the Protection of Marriage Act, Proposition 22, which banned same-sex marriage in California, and after the California Supreme Court overturned that initiative in In re Marriage Cases, he was an early supporter of and active in the Proposition 8 campaign, an initiative that would overturn the court ruling and again ban same-sex marriage. In June 2008, he urged voters to approve Proposition 8, saying "This is an opportunity to take back a little bit of dignity ... for kids, for all of us in California. It really disturbs me that the will of the people was overridden by four members of the Supreme Court."

LaMalfa opposed Mike Feuer's microstamping bill, AB 1471, which Governor Arnold Schwarzenegger signed into law on October 13, 2007.

LaMalfa was a co-author of ACA 20, which would empower law enforcement to act as Immigration, Customs Enforcement Agents and would have cracked down on illegal immigration.

In 2007, LaMalfa successfully passed AB 1645, a law that would prevent seizures of firearms in the event of an emergency or natural disaster. This was the first pro-gun legislation passed and signed into law in a decade. When LaMalfa was named the California Rifle and Pistol Association's "Legislator of the Year" for 2007, he said, "Receiving this award today from the California Rifle and Pistol Association is a truly humbling honor."

Committee assignments
 Joint Committee on Legislative Audit
 Public Safety
 West Nile virus

California Senate

2010 election
In 2010, LaMalfa ran for the California State Senate in the 4th District. In the Republican primary, he defeated State Assemblyman Rick Keene 58%–42%. In the general election, he defeated Lathe Gill 68%–32%.

Tenure
In November 2011, LaMalfa opposed a proposed bullet train, saying, "In light of the High Speed Rail plan that was submitted and that the numbers still do not work, California in this dire fiscal crisis that we're in, we're going to introduce legislation to repeal the HSR Authority and the funding for that the state was going to put forward".

LaMalfa opposed a bill that would require history teachers in all California public schools to teach history of homosexuality and gay civil rights. He said that Governor Jerry Brown was "out of touch with what I think are still mainstream American values. That's not the kind of stuff I want my kids learning about in public school. They've really crossed a line into a new frontier."

LaMalfa strongly opposed the National Popular Vote Interstate Compact, which would bypass the Electoral College, saying, "I think this is dangerous. It flies in the face of 220 years of election law. We have an electoral college; it was put there for a reason."

Committee assignments
 Agriculture
 Budget and Fiscal Review
 Elections and Constitutional Amendments (Vice Chair)
 Governance and Finance
 Natural Resources and Water (Vice Chair)
 Veterans Affairs
 Joint Committee on Legislative Audit
 Joint Committee on Fairs, Allocation, and Classification (Chair)
 Joint Committee on Fisheries and Aquaculture

U.S. House of Representatives

Elections

2012

In January 2012, 2nd district Congressman Wally Herger announced that he was retiring after 13 terms. Hours after his announcement, Republican consultant Dave Gilliard told Flash Report that Herger had endorsed LaMalfa as his successor. Herger's district was renumbered the 1st in the 2010 round of redistricting. LaMalfa's state senate district was largely coextensive with the western portion of the congressional district.

LaMalfa finished first in the June 2012 Republican primary election with 38% of the vote in an eight-person race, winning 10 of the district's 11 counties.

On November 6, 2012, LaMalfa defeated Democratic Party nominee Jim Reed 57%–43%.

2014

LaMalfa defeated Democratic nominee Heidi Hall in the general election with 61% of the vote.

2016

In the 2016 general election, LaMalfa defeated Democratic nominee Jim Reed with 59.1% of the vote.

2018

There were many candidates in the primary contest, including four candidates expressing preference for the Democratic party, two candidates expressing preference for the Republican party (including LaMalfa), and one candidate expressing preference for the Green Party of the United States. LaMalfa and Audrey Denney (who preferred the Democratic party) were the top two candidates in the primary, earning 51.7% and 17.9% of the vote respectively.

LaMalfa defeated Denney in the general election. In the hotly contested race, his campaign sent out an attack mailer showing a falsified picture of Denney signing a document supposedly endorsing Nancy Pelosi and liberal Democrats. Denney uploaded the original photograph to her campaign website in February 2018 to show her signing a promise to oppose campaign contributions from the petroleum industry. LaMalfa's campaign altered the wording on the document for their mailer.

LaMalfa defeated Denney in the general election, earning 54.9% of the 291,594 votes cast in the November 6 election, compared to Denney's 45.1%.

2020

LaMalfa defeated Denney in a general-election rematch with 57.0% of the vote to her 43.0%.

Committee assignments
 Committee on Agriculture
Subcommittee on Commodity Exchanges, Energy, and Credit
 Subcommittee on Conservation and Forestry (Ranking Member)
 Committee on Transportation and Infrastructure
 Subcommittee on Highways and Transit
 Subcommittee on Railroads, Pipelines, and Hazardous Materials
 Subcommittee on Water Resources and Environment

Caucus memberships
 Congressional Western Caucus
 Republican Study Committee
U.S.-Japan Caucus

Political positions

Abortion

LaMalfa supported the overturning of Roe v. Wade. He called Roe v. Wade "partisan" and said it "does not represent the values of our country."

Climate change
LaMalfa has said, "The climate of the globe has been fluctuating since God created it", and that the Book of Genesis disproves the scientific consensus on climate change, which he has called "bad science". In 2017, he said, "I don't buy the idea that manmade activity is responsible." In 2018, amidst wildfires, LaMalfa said, "I'm not going to quibble here today about whether it's man, or sunspot activity, or magma causing ice shelves to melt."

Donald Trump

During President Donald Trump's first impeachment, LaMalfa voted against impeachment, believing that Trump did not do anything that warranted impeachment, including during his phone call with the President of Ukraine.

After Trump lost the 2020 election and refused to concede, LaMalfa falsely claimed that "the circumstances surrounding this presidential election point to a fraudulent outcome." In December 2020, LaMalfa was one of 126 Republican members of the House of Representatives who signed an amicus brief in support of Texas v. Pennsylvania, a lawsuit filed at the United States Supreme Court contesting the results of the 2020 presidential election, in which Joe Biden defeated Trump. The Supreme Court declined to hear the case on the basis that Texas lacked standing under Article III of the Constitution to challenge the results of an election held by another state.

House Speaker Nancy Pelosi issued a statement that called signing the amicus brief an act of "election subversion."

On January 7, 2021, following the storming of the U.S. Capitol building by Trump supporters, LaMalfa and six other California representatives voted to reject the certification of Arizona's and Pennsylvania's electoral votes in the 2020 presidential election.

Race 
After the Unite the Right rally in Charlottesville, Virginia, LaMalfa stayed silent on the matter for five days until finally expressing disappointment upon being questioned.

After the passing of a defense spending bill with a provision aiming to weed out white supremacy from military and federal law enforcement, LaMalfa expressed concerns it would turn into a witch hunt and that racism will always exist. He also claimed it is not Congress's job to deal with racism in the government.

In June 2021, LaMalfa was one of 14 House Republicans to vote against legislation to establish Juneteenth, a celebration of the end of slavery, as a federal holiday.

Joe Biden
As of October 2021, LaMalfa had voted in line with Joe Biden's stated position 9.3% of the time.

Farming

From 1995 to 2016, LaMalfa's own farm received the largest amount of public assistance money from agricultural subsidies (over $1.7 million) in the history of Congress. Despite the conflict of interest, as a member of the House Agricultural Committee, he oversees farm subsidies. In 2017, his spokesman, Parker Williams, said that LaMalfa "voted to end direct farm subsidy payments in the very first farm bill he worked on" and that a new farm bill proposed does not provide subsidies for rice grown in California, a crop that LaMalfa farms. He supported the 2020–2021 Indian farmers' protest.

LGBT rights
LaMalfa opposes same-sex marriage and has said that legalizing it would "open the floodgates" for polygamy to be legalized. He has said that marriage is "an institution created by God and supposed to be held up and respected by men and women." He endorsed the First Amendment Defense Act, which, among other things, sought to criminalize same-sex intercourse. In 2015, LaMalfa consponsored a resolution to amend the Constitution to ban same-sex marriage. On July 19, 2022, he voted against the Respect for Marriage Act, a bill that would protect the right to same-sex marriage at a federal level.

Voter fraud
LaMalfa has said, "California is just a sieve on its voter security." Speaking about his own district, he said, "There's a percentage of illegal votes, probably in every district. Is it high here? Probably not. We don't really have the demographics that would be a really big push of that."

Taxes
LaMalfa voted in favor of the Tax Cuts and Jobs Act of 2017. According to him, the bill will enable his constituents to save more money and give them tax relief. He said that the bill will give a "booster shot to the U.S. economy", enable businesses to hire more workers, and cause more products to be made in the USA, especially in Redding.

Colleagues 
In November 2021, after Representative Paul Gosar shared an animated video of himself killing Representative Alexandria Ocasio-Cortez and attacking President Biden, LaMalfa voted against Gosar's censure.

Defense
In September 2021, LaMalfa was among 75 House Republicans to vote against the National Defense Authorization Act of 2022, which contains a provision that would require women to be drafted.

Crime 
LaMalfa has expressed support for prosecuting minors charged with felonies as adults and has supported the construction of additional juvenile detention centers.

Education 
LaMalfa supports posting the Ten Commandments in public schools. In 2013, he co-sponsored the Abstinence Education Reallocation Act, which sought to teach abstinence in public schools.

Electoral history

Personal life
LaMalfa is married to Jill LaMalfa. They have three children. LaMalfa commutes weekly from California to Washington, D.C. He is an owner and manager of the DSL LaMalfa Family Partnership, which owns and operates the family rice farm in Richvale, California. LaMalfa employs a farm manager who runs the farm while he is in Washington.

LaMalfa has donated over $100,000 to his own campaigns and other Republican Party causes and candidates. As of 2018, he has a net worth of nearly $3.5 million.

References

External links

 Congressman Doug LaMalfa official U.S. House website
 Doug LaMalfa for Congress
 
 
 Join California Doug La Malfa

|-

|-

|-

1960 births
21st-century American politicians
American people of Italian descent
California Polytechnic State University alumni
Republican Party California state senators
Farmers from California
Living people
Republican Party members of the California State Assembly
Politicians from Oroville, California
Republican Party members of the United States House of Representatives from California